Daksha Vyas (born 26 December 1941) is a Gujarati poet, critic and editor from Gujarat, India.

Life 
Daksha Vyas was born on 26 December 1941 at Vyara (now in Tapi district, Gujarat). She completed primary and secondary education in Vyara. She received B. A. in 1962 from Surat, M. A. in 1965 and Ph. D. in 1978 for her thesis Swatantryottar Gujarati Kavita: Paridarshan. She taught Gujarati in Gurukul Mahila College in Porbandar from 1967 to 1973 and later in Arts College, Vyara from 1973 until retirement.

Works 
Daksha Vyas is a poet, critic and editor.

Alpana (2000) is her poetry collection. Bhavpratibhav (1981), Saundaryadarshi Kavio (1984), Roopak Granthi (1988), Anusarga (1998), Adivasi Samaj (2001) and Pariprekshana (2004) are her works of criticism. Atamne Ajwale (2004) is her philosophical work while Tatvacharcha (1988), Chal Man Vyara Nagari (1997) and Sarjakna Sannidhye are edited by her. Saundaryadarshi Kavio includes study and criticism of four leading poets of 1950s; Rajendra Shah, Niranjan Bhagat, Ushnas and Jayant Pathak. Sanmukham is her other work.

See also
 List of Gujarati-language writers

References

External links
 

Gujarati-language writers
People from Tapi district
1941 births
Living people
20th-century Indian poets
Indian editors
Indian literary critics
Indian women editors
21st-century Indian poets
21st-century Indian women writers
21st-century Indian writers
20th-century Indian women writers
Women writers from Gujarat
Poets from Gujarat
Indian women poets